Luís Gonzaga Duque Estrada, known as Gonzaga Duque (21 June 1863, Rio de Janeiro - 29 September 1911, Rio de Janeiro) was a Brazilian writer and critic. He was of Swedish descent on his father's side.

Life and work 
After completing his primary education, he enrolled at the prestigious , then studied at the Colégio Meneses Vieira. He completed his studies at the Colégio Paixão in Petrópolis. It would appear that he never attended a university.

The initial reviews were not kind; calling it boring, morbid and full of pseudo-intellectual chatter. Later, it received some praise for its documentary value. Recent criticism calls it a significant contribution to understanding the artistic community of late 19th century Brazil and its relationship to the outdated approaches taught at the Imperial Academy of Fine Arts.

As a critic, he produced the first systematic examination of Brazilian art in his book A Arte Brasileira. This came during a period when the artists there were beginning to make a living entirely from the proceeds of their painting. In 1907, he was a co-founder of the cultural journal, . Known to be an unsparing critic in the cause of modernism, his caustic comments about the works of João Zeferino da Costa, who worked in a conservative, classical style, discouraged Da Costa from ever exhibiting again.

The Brazilian art scholar, Vera Lins, has done a thorough study of his work, which is available online.

Bibliography 
A Arte Brasileira. São Paulo: Mercado de Letras, 1994.
Mocidade Morta. Rio de Janeiro: Fundação Casa de Rui Barbosa, 1995 
Horto de Mágoas - contos, Vera Lins and Júlio Castañon Guimaraes, Eds. Prefeitura da Cidade do Rio de Janeiro, 1996.
Impressões de um Amador: textos esparsos de crítica, 1882-1909, Vera Lins and Júlio Castañon Guimaraes, Eds. Belo Horizonte: Editora UFMG, 2001.
Revoluções brasileiras: resumos históricos. Francisco Foot Hardman and Vera Lins, Eds. Belo Horizonte: Editora UFMG, co-edição Giordano, 1998.

References

Further reading
Guimararães, Júlio Castañon. "Gonzaga Duque: ficção e crítica de artes plásticas". In: Carvalho, José Murilo de, et al. Sobre o pré-modernismo. Rio de Janeiro: Fundação Casa de Rui Barbosa, 1988.
Lins, Vera. Gonzaga Duque: A Estratégia do Franco-Atirador. Rio de Janeiro: Editora Tempo Brasileiro, 1991. 
Lins, Vera. Gonzaga Duque: crítica e utopia na virada do século. Rio de Janeiro: Fundação Casa de Rui Barbosa, 1996. 
Vermeersch, Paula. Lista de artigos de Gonzaga Duque na Revista Kosmos. Rotunda. Campinas: Centro de Estudos de Pesquisa das Artes no Brasil (CEPAB), Instituto de Artes, Unicamp, 2003. 
Vermeersch, Paula. Por uma arte brasileira: a pintura acadêmica no final do Segundo Reinado e a crítica de Gonzaga Duque. Rotunda. Campinas: Centro de Estudos de Pesquisa das Artes no Brasil (CEPAB), Instituto de Artes, Unicamp, 2003.

External links
 Casa de Rui Barbosa: Vera Lins: Linhas cruzadas - decifrando o arquivo de Gonzaga Duque,  Online.

1863 births
1911 deaths
Brazilian art critics
People from Rio de Janeiro (city)